The IOOF Relief Home in Park City, Utah was built in 1890.  It was listed on the National Register of Historic Places in 1984.

References

Houses on the National Register of Historic Places in Utah
1890s architecture in the United States
Houses in Summit County, Utah
Odd Fellows buildings in Utah
National Register of Historic Places in Summit County, Utah
Buildings and structures in Park City, Utah